Linton may refer to:

Places

Australia
 Linton, Victoria

Canada
 Linton, Ontario
 Linton, Quebec

United Kingdom

England
 Linton, Cambridgeshire
 Linton, Derbyshire
 Linton (near Bromyard), Herefordshire
 Linton (near Ross-on-Wye), Herefordshire
 Linton, Kent
 Linton, Northumberland
 Linton, North Yorkshire
 Linton Falls, a waterfall on the River Wharfe
 Linton, Somerset
 Linton, West Yorkshire
 Linton-on-Ouse, and the RAF base RAF Linton-on-Ouse
 Linton Road, Oxford

Scotland
 East Linton, East Lothian
 Linton, Orkney
 Linton, Scottish Borders
 Linton Bay, island of Shapinsay
 West Linton, Scottish Borders

New Zealand
 Linton, New Zealand, a suburb of Palmerston North

United States
 Linton, Georgia
 Linton, Indiana
 Linton, Kentucky
 Linton, North Dakota
 Linton Hall, Virginia
 Linton, Wisconsin
 Linton Falls (Oregon), a waterfall in the Three Sisters Wilderness

See also
 Linton (name) for a list of people with the name Linton
 Linton Falls (disambiguation)
 Lynton, a town in North Devon, England
 Linnton, Portland, Oregon, a neighborhood